Dararweyne is a town in south-central Sanaag in Somaliland.

In November 2019, residents of El Afweyn and Dararweyne signed a peace deal that halted fighting for four years.

See also
Administrative divisions of Somaliland
Regions of Somaliland
Districts of Somaliland
Somalia–Somaliland border

References

External links
Dararweyne

Populated places in Sanaag